Thorpe Marsh Nature Reserve is a 77-hectare (190-acre) nature reserve located south-west of Thorpe in Balne, north of Doncaster in South Yorkshire. The reserve is managed and maintained by a team of volunteers under the Yorkshire Wildlife Trust as well as Doncaster Metropolitan Borough Council.

The reserve shares its name with the coal-fired power station which occupied the adjacent land prior to its closure in 1994 and the demolition of its remaining cooling towers in 2012. The site is on an area of lowland susceptible to flooding (floodplain) by the River Don, thus creating an area of marshland on which the reserve sits (hence the appended "marsh").

History

Before the power station (pre–1959)

Prior to the enclosure (pre–1766)

Middle Ages (pre–14th century) 
During the Middle Ages, Thorpe Marsh was an agricultural site on which farmers used the open field system, creating a ridge and furrow pattern via the use of ploughs. This pattern is still visible today, particularly in Reedholme and Applehurst fields.

Early landowners (late 14th century) 
Prior to 1385, lands in the present Thorpe Marsh area were owned by one Roger del Grene, of Owston, a landowner in the parishes of Owston, Burghwallis, Campsall and Barnby Dun, the last of which the reserve lies within. On 8 September 1385, del Grene granted all of his lands in the above parishes to John Isbell (chaplain to Agnes, Roger's wife), Edward del Holme, John Leche and Elias Ode.

Henryson Family (early 15th century–1489) 
By the early 15th century, land in Thorpe Marsh was owned by chaplain John Shirley, likely purchased from one or multiple of the aforementioned landowners. On 2 November 1440, Shirley granted his lands in the parishes of Owston, Skellow, Carcroft and the Thorpe in Balne area of Barnby Dun parish to his brother-in-law, Robert Henryson, who had married the chaplain's sister. Henryson later granted a messuage including a garden and three closes in Balne to his son, also named Robert Henryson, and all other lands in the parishes of Owston and Barnby Dun to his other son, John Henryson. Robert returned his land to his father on 18 January 1482, whilst John gave the remainder of his lands to his brother by quitclaim on 28 May 1489.

Mellish letters & the Foljambe Family (1489–1731) 
In 1731, following the River Run Navigation Acts of 1725 and 1726, three letters mentioning Thorpe Marsh were addressed to a Joseph Mellish of Doncaster, the likely father of MPs Joseph Mellish and William Mellish, regarding the Navigation Bill. The first letter was dated February 1731 and was written by William Mellish, assumedly addressing the letter to his father. The second letter was dated March 1731 and was written by a T. Yarborough, whilst the third letter was dated April 1731 and written by Edward Simpson, later MP for Dover.

The letters pertain to a cut being made on Thorpe Marsh for the construction of the River Dun Navigation which would conclusively go ahead the following year. The letter composed by Mr Yarborough commented that the cut may be injurious to the estate of one Mr Foljambe, potentially Francis Foljambe of Aldwarke, the maternal grandfather of Francis Ferrand Foljambe MP and patrilineal 7th great-grandson of Sir Godfrey de Foljambe. This letter in conjunction with records held by Foljambe of Osberton implies that the Foljambe family acquired ownership of the Thorpe Marsh area, possibly between 1489 and 1506.

Ancient origins of place names (1339–1849) 
The 1731 letters to Joseph Mellish represent the earliest known use of the name Thorpe Marsh, whilst the names of other areas within the reserve have also been in use for centuries; the names Reedholme, Cockshaw, Smallholme and Tilts were all present by 1849. The name Thorpe Marsh is most likely derived from its neighbour village of Thorpe in Balne, whose name emerged as early as 1339 of Norse origin. The use of the names Applehurst, Reedholme, Sicklecroft and Smallholme can be traced to circa 1841, 1771, 1848 and 1620 respectively. The origin of the name Cockshaw is uncertain however must precede 1849, and was mentioned in railway and land drainage archives of January 1864 when the deviation of Cockshaw Drain was proposed to accommodate a railway.

Pre-Industrial (1766–1916) 
In 1766 a Private Act of Parliament was passed for the enclosure of Thorpe Marsh and Grumblehirst (later known as Grumble Hurst); the enclosing freeholder remains unknown, and the present site likely changed hands between 1731 and 1766 as Francis Ferrand Foljambe only inherited estates in Aldwarke, Wadworth, Steeton and Westow. On 16 September 1768, Thorpe Marsh and Grumble Hirst were enclosed and early landowners on the enclosed site include William Fretwell and Thomas Coward, of Barnby Dun and Burghwallis respectively.

By the late 1770s, primary landowners included farmer William Brook – who granted a £240 mortgage on the site to his sisters-in-law, Sarah and Mary Townrow (spinsters from Conisbrough) in 1778 – Joshua Hepworth, William Fores, and Henry Walker Sr.

By 1804, drainage plans were being produced across the area. The Thorpe Marsh area was drained in 1835 under the first iteration of the Dun Drainage Act, enforced by William Pilkington, whilst other areas of the River Don were drained between 1873 and 1879 under the Dun Drainage Amendment Act.

Early 20th Century (1916–1959) 
In 1916 the LNER Gowdall and Braithwell Railway was constructed and opened, and this line intersected the modern day area of the reserve, separating Reedholme and Cockshaw. The line was closed in September 1970, leaving a raised bank running through the reserve which is now known as the Main Embankment and presently serves as a primary artery for nature transects and hide placement.

Widespread flooding across Yorkshire in May 1932, which adversely affected the Bentley and Arksey region, elicited planning at Thorpe Marsh for the construction of a barrier bank on the present-day reserve, now known as Norwood Barrier Bank. These plans came to fruition by 1933, alongside earlier bank raising along the Ea Beck in 1929.

The triangulation station at Cockshaw Dyke in the west of the reserve was computed on 1 June 1949 and underwent maintenance in 1961 however has since been lost, potentially due to dyke works.

Thorpe Marsh Power Station (1959–1994) 

The land to construct a power station on the Thorpe Marsh site was acquired in 1957 and construction began in 1959. Thorpe Marsh Power Station was opened on 2 June 1967 by Ernest G. Boissier.

For most of its history, the present Thorpe Marsh site was most easily accessed from the village of Barnby Dun to the east via Royalty Bridge from Royalty Lane. In 1959, during the construction of Thorpe Marsh Power Station, Fordstead Lane was extended to connect with the villages of Almholme and Arksey. This provided access to Norwood Sluice which had existed since before 1849 as Norwood Foot Bridge and Floodgate and had previously connected to Almholme via footpath. Norwood Gate is now one of four remaining entrances to the nature reserve and is listed by the Yorkshire Wildlife Trust as the reserve's primary entrance.

In the 1960s, land in the present Thorpe Marsh Nature Reserve was purchased by the Central Electricity Generating Board where large volumes of fly ash were tipped. This not only raised the embankment at Thorpe Mere View, but also contributed to the proliferation of a wide range of plant species across the reserve.

Following the closure of Thorpe Marsh Power Station in 1994, the CEBG remained as the freehold owner of the Power Station and Nature Reserve sites.

Nature reserve (1980–present) 

Thorpe Marsh Nature Reserve was opened on 16 May 1980 by countryman, author and television presenter Phil Drabble. The site was initially limited to Thorpe Mere, however was later expanded to include the surrounding coal storage and fly ash deposit areas.

From 1990 onwards, the Central Electricity Generating Board underwent rapid privatisation and broke up into four separate companies. In 1995, following the closure of the power station, Able UK acquired 45 hectares (111 acres) of the power station site. The CEGB conclusively dissolved in 2001 and thus relinquished its remaining ownership of Thorpe Marsh Power Station and Nature Reserve to National Grid, its successor in the energy transmission sector. In 2022, The Banks Group acquired freehold ownership of the nature reserve land, and presently leases the land to farmers. The Environment Agency manages the embankments surrounding the reserve.

In October 2011, permission was acquired by Thorpe Marsh Power Limited to construct the Thorpe Marsh Combined Cycle Gas Turbine Power Station, and further permission to construct the  Thorpe Marsh Gas Pipeline between the station and the National Transmission System for gas near Camblesforth in Selby, North Yorkshire was acquired in March 2016. Construction is expected to begin in 2022, and the CCGT plant to enter commercial operation in 2023. 

Between 2021 and 2022, drilling - conducted by Acorn Power Development Limited with equipment from General Electric - was ongoing around the site.

In October 2022, Banks Renewables announced the planning of Thorpe Marsh Green Energy Hub, to be constructed adjacent to the nature reserve, its site boundaries encompassing external nature observation areas. The project is estimated to involve the recovery of up to 2.25 million tonnes of pulverised fuel ash tipped by the CEBG, as well as the saving of over 265,000 tonnes of carbon dioxide via the construction of a 2.8 GWh battery hub in the north of the development area, projected to be the largest of its kind in the United Kingdom and the 3rd largest in the world. The project is also expected to involve the preservation of wildlife surrounding the reserve, creating new woodland, wetland and grassland area in the south of the development area. The energy hub is projected to be completed and operational by 2027.

The nature reserve presently contains seven hides for use in birdwatching. These hides are:
 West Mere Hide (overlooking Thorpe Mere) at 
 North Mere Hide (overlooking Thorpe Mere) at 
 Stephen's Hide (overlooking Thorpe Mere) at 
 Applehurst Pond Hide (overlooking Applehurst Pond) at 
 South Mere Hide (overlooking Thorpe Mere) at 
 Sicklecroft Hide (overlooking Sicklecroft) at 
 The Barry Foster Memorial Hide (overlooking bird feeders in a corner of Reedholme) at

Flora
Thorpe Marsh is home to a variety of plant species. Woodland tree species surrounding the mere include:

Other, smaller plant species may be found on the reserve's middle-age ridge-and-furrow corrugations, including but not limited to:

Lepidoptera
Lepidoptera species counts are frequently recorded at Thorpe Marsh by volunteer wardens in transects. The reserve is home to 21 species of butterfly, with meadow brown being the most frequently-recorded, and small heath being the least frequently-recorded.

The most successful species between 2016 and 2021 at the reserve were small tortoiseshell (+200%), peacock (+13%) and meadow brown (+6%), whilst the least successful were brimstone (−86%), small skipper (−71%) and common blue (−57%). 

The most successful year for lepidoptera since 2016 was 2019 with a total of 2,870 individuals recorded, whilst the least successful year was 2018 with a total of 1,790 individuals recorded.

Lepidoptera recorded at the reserve include:

The first species of the lepidoptera order to be officially recorded at Thorpe Marsh was a Scorched Wing Moth on 1 January 1973.

Odonata
Thorpe Marsh Nature Reserve is home to 19 species of odonata, composed of 7 damselfly species and 12 dragonfly species, the latter of which include 6 hawker species, 3 chaser species, 1 skimmer species and 3 darter species. Damselfly species include:

Dragonfly species include:

The first species of the odonata order to be officially recorded at Thorpe Marsh was a Blue-tailed Damselfly on 21 June 1970.

Birds
At Thorpe Marsh Nature Reserve, more than 113 species of bird have been recorded since 1980, including 27 birds listed as Red Conservation Status by the RSPB and 41 listed as Amber. A list of birds spotted at the reserve which are denoted as Red Conservation Status are as follows:

Other birds which have been recorded at Thorpe Marsh include but are not limited to Common Tern, Great White Egret, Grey Wagtail, Hobby, Kestrel, Kingfisher, Little Egret, Marsh Harrier, Peregrine Falcon, Ruddy Duck, Spotted Redshank, Water Rail and Wigeon.

The first bird species to be officially recorded at Thorpe Marsh was a Little Stint on 1 September 1892.

References

Further reading
 YWT Thorpe Marsh
 Visit Doncaster – Thorpe Marsh Nature Reserve
 Thorpe Marsh Nature Reserve Circular Walk
 Birdguides – Thorpe Marsh YWT
 Thorpe Marsh Power Ltd
 Birds In Counties: An Ornithological Bibliography Of The Counties Of England, Wales, Scotland And The Isle Of Man
 Doncaster Bird Report 1995
 Doncaster Bird Report 1990
 Doncaster Bird Report 1982

Nature reserves in Yorkshire